The 2002–03 NBA season was the Raptors' 8th season in the National Basketball Association. During the offseason, the Raptors acquired Lamond Murray from the Cleveland Cavaliers, but missed the entire season with a foot injury. Things looked bleak for the Raptors early in the season as Hakeem Olajuwon announced his retirement due to a back injury. The Raptors played around .500 with a 4–4 start to the season, but then lost six straight afterwards. The team then suffered a 12-game losing streak between December and January. In addition, Vince Carter continued to feel the lingering effect of his knee injury as he missed most of the first half of the season. Despite playing only 43 games, he was still voted to play in his fourth straight All-Star Game. However, Carter ended up giving the starting position to a retiring Michael Jordan. Despite this, the Raptors lost their final eight games of the season finishing seventh in the Central Division with a dismal 24–58 record. Following the season, Lenny Wilkens was let go as head coach of the Raptors, and was replaced with Kevin O'Neill.

NBA Draft

Roster

Roster Notes
 Small forward Lamond Murray missed the entire season due to a foot injury.
 Center Eric Montross missed the entire season due to a stress reaction in left foot.

Regular season

Highs

Lows

Record vs. opponents

Game log

|- bgcolor="bbffbb"
| 1
| October 30
| Washington
| 
| Morris Peterson (20)
| Antonio Davis (16)
| Alvin Williams (6)
| Air Canada Centre20,165
| 1–0

|- bgcolor="ffcccc"
| 2
| November 1
| @ San Antonio
| 
| Vince Carter (18)
| Jelani McCoy (15)
| Lindsey Hunter (3)
| SBC Center18,787
| 1–1
|- bgcolor="ffcccc"
| 3
| November 2
| @ Houston
| 
| Lindsey Hunter (17)
| Michael Bradley, Morris Peterson (7)
| Alvin Williams (3)
| Compaq Center16,285
| 1–2
|- bgcolor="bbffbb"
| 4
| November 4
| Chicago
| 
| Alvin Williams (25)
| Jerome Williams (12)
| Alvin Williams (8)
| Air Canada Centre17,441
| 2–2
|- bgcolor="ffcccc"
| 5
| November 6
| Dallas
| 
| Voshon Lenard (20)
| Jerome Williams (9)
| Lindsey Hunter (6)
| Air Canada Centre19,800
| 2–3
|- bgcolor="ffcccc"
| 6
| November 9
| @ Indiana
| 
| Voshon Lenard (22)
| Michael Bradley (10)
| Alvin Williams (7)
| Conseco Fieldhouse15,365
| 2–4
|- bgcolor="bbffbb"
| 7
| November 12
| @ Orlando
| 
| Alvin Williams (32)
| Morris Peterson (12)
| Voshon Lenard, Jerome Williams (4)
| TD Waterhouse Centre13,402
| 3–4
|- bgcolor="bbffbb"
| 8
| November 15
| Denver
| 
| Voshon Lenard (19)
| Jerome Williams (9)
| Voshon Lenard (6)
| Air Canada Centre18,985
| 4–4
|- bgcolor="ffcccc"
| 9
| November 17
| Utah
| 
| Alvin Williams (20)
| Antonio Davis, Jelani McCoy (8)
| Alvin Williams (6)
| Air Canada Centre19,800
| 4–5
|- bgcolor="ffcccc"
| 10
| November 18
| @ Atlanta
| 
| Voshon Lenard, Morris Peterson, Alvin Williams (17)
| Voshon Lenard, Morris Peterson (6)
| Alvin Williams (5)
| Philips Arena6,374
| 4–6
|- bgcolor="ffcccc"
| 11
| November 20
| Indiana
| 
| Voshon Lenard (22)
| Antonio Davis (10)
| Alvin Williams (6)
| Air Canada Centre19,206
| 4–7
|- bgcolor="ffcccc"
| 12
| November 22
| @ Philadelphia
| 
| Antonio Davis (27)
| Antonio Davis (12)
| Alvin Williams (6)
| First Union Center19,410
| 4–8
|- bgcolor="ffcccc"
| 13
| November 24
| Philadelphia
| 
| Alvin Williams (25)
| Antonio Davis, Jerome Williams (8)
| Voshon Lenard, Alvin Williams (5)
| Air Canada Centre19,800
| 4–9
|- bgcolor="ffcccc"
| 14
| November 27
| New York
| 
| Antonio Davis (20)
| Greg Foster (9)
| Alvin Williams (7)
| Air Canada Centre19,800
| 4–10
|- bgcolor="bbffbb"
| 15
| November 29
| @ Boston
| 
| Morris Peterson (31)
| Greg Foster (9)
| Alvin Williams (11)
| FleetCenter18,624
| 5–10

|- bgcolor="bbffbb"
| 16
| December 1
| @ Memphis
| 
| Vince Carter (27)
| Antonio Davis (12)
| Alvin Williams (8)
| Pyramid Arena13,213
| 6–10
|- bgcolor="ffcccc"
| 17
| December 2
| @ Dallas
| 
| Alvin Williams (27)
| Antonio Davis (9)
| Alvin Williams (7)
| American Airlines Center19,696
| 6–11
|- bgcolor="ffcccc"
| 18
| December 4
| @ New Orleans
| 
| Vince Carter (26)
| Antonio Davis (11)
| Jermaine Jackson (5)
| New Orleans Arena13,342
| 6–12
|- bgcolor="bbffbb"
| 19
| December 6
| Chicago
| 
| Voshon Lenard (23)
| Vince Carter (10)
| Vince Carter, Alvin Williams (5)
| Air Canada Centre18,862
| 7–12
|- bgcolor="ffcccc"
| 20
| December 8
| Portland
| 
| Vince Carter (25)
| Michael Bradley, Jerome Williams (10)
| Alvin Williams (7)
| Air Canada Centre18,645
| 7–13
|- bgcolor="ffcccc"
| 21
| December 11
| @ Cleveland
| 
| Voshon Lenard (24)
| Jerome Williams (8)
| Lindsey Hunter, Jermaine Jackson, Voshon Lenard (4)
| Gund Arena9,090
| 7–14
|- bgcolor="ffcccc"
| 22
| December 13
| Seattle
| 
| Lindsey Hunter (21)
| Jelani McCoy, Morris Peterson (7)
| Jermaine Jackson, Morris Peterson (4)
| Air Canada Centre18,111
| 7–15
|- bgcolor="ffcccc"
| 23
| December 15
| Washington
| 
| Lindsey Hunter (22)
| Jelani McCoy (10)
| Voshon Lenard, Alvin Williams (5)
| Air Canada Centre19,800
| 7–16
|- bgcolor="bbffbb"
| 24
| December 17
| @ Milwaukee
| 
| Voshon Lenard (23)
| Nate Huffman, Jelani McCoy (9)
| Alvin Williams (7)
| Bradley Center15,926
| 8–16
|- bgcolor="ffcccc"
| 25
| December 18
| @ Chicago
| 
| Morris Peterson (22)
| Jelani McCoy, Jerome Williams (11)
| Lindsey Hunter, Alvin Williams (4)
| United Center16,111
| 8–17
|- bgcolor="ffcccc"
| 26
| December 20
| Miami
| 
| Voshon Lenard (19)
| Jerome Williams (9)
| Jermaine Jackson (3)
| Air Canada Centre19,235
| 8–18
|- bgcolor="ffcccc"
| 27
| December 22
| L.A. Lakers
| 
| Morris Peterson (27)
| Jerome Williams (12)
| Alvin Williams (6)
| Air Canada Centre19,800
| 8–19
|- bgcolor="ffcccc"
| 28
| December 26
| @ Seattle
| 
| Voshon Lenard (27)
| Jerome Williams (11)
| Alvin Williams (6)
| KeyArena16,139
| 8–20
|- bgcolor="ffcccc"
| 29
| December 27
| @ Golden State
| 
| Voshon Lenard, Alvin Williams (17)
| Michael Bradley (15)
| Voshon Lenard (4)
| The Arena in Oakland16,487
| 8–21
|- bgcolor="ffcccc"
| 30
| December 29
| @ L.A. Lakers
| 
| Morris Peterson (18)
| Jelani McCoy, Morris Peterson (5)
| Alvin Williams (6)
| Staples Center18,997
| 8–22
|- bgcolor="ffcccc"
| 31
| December 30
| @ Utah
| 
| Voshon Lenard, Morris Peterson (18)
| Jelani McCoy, Morris Peterson (6)
| Voshon Lenard, Alvin Williams (5)
| Delta Center19,911
| 8–23

|- bgcolor="ffcccc"
| 32
| January 1
| @ New York
| 
| Alvin Williams (15)
| Jelani McCoy (15)
| Alvin Williams (5)
| Madison Square Garden18,540
| 8–24
|- bgcolor="ffcccc"
| 33
| January 3
| Cleveland
| 
| Alvin Williams (25)
| Jerome Williams (18)
| Lindsey Hunter (7)
| Air Canada Centre17,667
| 8–25
|- bgcolor="ffcccc"
| 34
| January 5
| New Orleans
| 
| Morris Peterson (17)
| Jelani McCoy (8)
| Alvin Williams (7)
| Air Canada Centre18,568
| 8–26
|- bgcolor="ffcccc"
| 35
| January 6
| @ Detroit
| 
| Antonio Davis (21)
| Jerome Williams (15)
| Morris Peterson (5)
| The Palace of Auburn Hills16,239
| 8–27
|- bgcolor="ffcccc"
| 36
| January 10
| New Jersey
| 
| Rafer Alston (17)
| Jerome Williams (10)
| Morris Peterson, Alvin Williams (4)
| Air Canada Centre19,314
| 8–28
|- bgcolor="bbffbb"
| 37
| January 12
| Minnesota
| 
| Morris Peterson (20)
| Jerome Williams (14)
| Rafer Alston, Alvin Williams (8)
| Air Canada Centre19,800
| 9–28
|- bgcolor="bbffbb"
| 38
| January 14
| @ Washington
| 
| Morris Peterson (21)
| Jerome Williams (20)
| Rafer Alston (11)
| MCI Center20,173
| 10–28
|- bgcolor="ffcccc"
| 39
| January 15
| Milwaukee
| 
| Morris Peterson (22)
| Jerome Williams (17)
| Rafer Alston, Antonio Davis (5)
| Air Canada Centre18,357
| 10–29
|- bgcolor="ffcccc"
| 40
| January 17
| @ New Jersey
| 
| Morris Peterson (20)
| Jerome Williams (15)
| Rafer Alston (8)
| Continental Airlines Arena17,107
| 10–30
|- bgcolor="ffcccc"
| 41
| January 19
| Orlando
| 
| Morris Peterson (25)
| Jerome Williams (10)
| Alvin Williams (9)
| Air Canada Centre19,800
| 10–31
|- bgcolor="ffcccc"
| 42
| January 20
| @ Minnesota
| 
| Voshon Lenard (22)
| Jerome Williams (13)
| Rafer Alston, Alvin Williams (5)
| Target Center14,773
| 10–32
|- bgcolor="ffcccc"
| 43
| January 22
| @ Indiana
| 
| Voshon Lenard (19)
| Jerome Williams (14)
| Alvin Williams (9)
| Conseco Fieldhouse15,488
| 10–33
|- bgcolor="bbffbb"
| 44
| January 26
| Sacramento
| 
| Vince Carter (22)
| Jerome Williams (14)
| Rafer Alston (7)
| Air Canada Centre19,800
| 11–33
|- bgcolor="ffcccc"
| 45
| January 29
| @ New Orleans
| 
| Voshon Lenard (16)
| Antonio Davis (7)
| Morris Peterson (6)
| New Orleans Arena13,014
| 11–34
|- bgcolor="bbffbb"
| 46
| January 31
| Indiana
| 
| Antonio Davis (20)
| Antonio Davis, Jerome Williams (10)
| Alvin Williams (7)
| Air Canada Centre18,977
| 12–34

|- bgcolor="bbffbb"
| 47
| February 2
| L.A. Clippers
| 
| Voshon Lenard (30)
| Michael Bradley (11)
| Alvin Williams (9)
| Air Canada Centre17,862
| 13–34
|- bgcolor="bbffbb"
| 48
| February 4
| @ Milwaukee
| 
| Vince Carter (25)
| Antonio Davis (16)
| Vince Carter (4)
| Bradley Center13,765
| 14–34
|- bgcolor="bbffbb"
| 49
| February 12
| Atlanta
| 
| Antonio Davis (22)
| Jerome Williams (14)
| Alvin Williams (7)
| Air Canada Centre17,372
| 15–34
|- bgcolor="ffcccc"
| 50
| February 14
| Golden State
| 
| Voshon Lenard (26)
| Antonio Davis (14)
| Alvin Williams (10)
| Air Canada Centre19,346
| 15–35
|- bgcolor="bbffbb"
| 51
| February 16
| Orlando
| 
| Alvin Williams (22)
| Antonio Davis (11)
| Vince Carter, Voshon Lenard (5)
| Air Canada Centre19,800
| 16–35
|- bgcolor="ffcccc"
| 52
| February 19
| Detroit
| 
| Morris Peterson (20)
| Jerome Williams (17)
| Alvin Williams (9)
| Air Canada Centre19,140
| 16–36
|- bgcolor="bbffbb"
| 53
| February 21
| Phoenix
| 
| Antonio Davis (22)
| Jerome Williams (13)
| Alvin Williams (7)
| Air Canada Centre18,695
| 17–36
|- bgcolor="ffcccc"
| 54
| February 26
| @ Chicago
| 
| Voshon Lenard (20)
| Jerome Williams (11)
| Alvin Williams (9)
| United Center18,178
| 17–37
|- bgcolor="ffcccc"
| 55
| February 28
| @ Boston
| 
| Vince Carter (18)
| Antonio Davis (14)
| Rafer Alston (7)
| FleetCenter18,624
| 17–38

|- bgcolor="bbffbb"
| 56
| March 2
| Boston
| 
| Antonio Davis (19)
| Michael Bradley (13)
| Alvin Williams (6)
| Air Canada Centre19,800
| 18–38
|- bgcolor="bbffbb"
| 57
| March 4
| @ Washington
| 
| Vince Carter (24)
| Michael Bradley, Jerome Williams (7)
| Antonio Davis (5)
| MCI Center20,173
| 19–38
|- bgcolor="ffcccc"
| 58
| March 5
| Houston
| 
| Vince Carter (21)
| Jerome Williams (10)
| Antonio Davis (6)
| Air Canada Centre20,171
| 19–39
|- bgcolor="bbffbb"
| 59
| March 8
| @ Atlanta
| 
| Vince Carter (43)
| Jerome Williams (15)
| Antonio Davis (8)
| Philips Arena19,445
| 20–39
|- bgcolor="ffcccc"
| 60
| March 9
| Memphis
| 
| Vince Carter (26)
| Antonio Davis (8)
| Alvin Williams (9)
| Air Canada Centre19,138
| 20–40
|- bgcolor="ffcccc"
| 61
| March 11
| @ Denver
| 
| Vince Carter (21)
| Michael Bradley (12)
| Alvin Williams (6)
| Pepsi Center13,409
| 20–41
|- bgcolor="ffcccc"
| 62
| March 12
| @ Portland
| 
| Vince Carter (21)
| Michael Bradley (10)
| Rafer Alston (6)
| Rose Garden19,991
| 20–42
|- bgcolor="ffcccc"
| 63
| March 14
| @ Sacramento
| 
| Vince Carter, Morris Peterson (16)
| Mamadou N'Diaye (10)
| Rafer Alston (7)
| ARCO Arena17,317
| 20–43
|- bgcolor="ffcccc"
| 64
| March 16
| @ L.A. Clippers
| 
| Vince Carter (28)
| Antonio Davis, Jerome Williams (8)
| Alvin Williams (5)
| Staples Center18,268
| 20–44
|- bgcolor="ffcccc"
| 65
| March 17
| @ Phoenix
| 
| Morris Peterson (17)
| Antonio Davis (15)
| Alvin Williams (7)
| America West Arena15,326
| 20–45
|- bgcolor="bbffbb"
| 66
| March 19
| Atlanta
| 
| Vince Carter (27)
| Jerome Williams (10)
| Alvin Williams (6)
| Air Canada Centre17,885
| 21–45
|- bgcolor="ffcccc"
| 67
| March 21
| @ Miami
| 
| Vince Carter (30)
| Jerome Williams (9)
| Alvin Williams (7)
| American Airlines Arena14,492
| 21–46
|- bgcolor="ffcccc"
| 68
| March 23
| Philadelphia
| 
| Vince Carter (22)
| Antonio Davis (9)
| Vince Carter (9)
| Air Canada Centre19,800
| 21–47
|- bgcolor="ffcccc"
| 69
| March 24
| @ New York
| 
| Antonio Davis (23)
| Antonio Davis (12)
| Alvin Williams (8)
| Madison Square Garden18,824
| 21–48
|- bgcolor="bbffbb"
| 70
| March 26
| Cleveland
| 
| Morris Peterson (21)
| Jelani McCoy (8)
| Rafer Alston (6)
| Air Canada Centre16,832
| 22–48
|- bgcolor="ffcccc"
| 71
| March 28
| New Orleans
| 
| Vince Carter (21)
| Michael Bradley (11)
| Alvin Williams (5)
| Air Canada Centre18,773
| 22–49
|- bgcolor="bbffbb"
| 72
| March 30
| New York
| 
| Vince Carter (28)
| Michael Bradley (11)
| Vince Carter (6)
| Air Canada Centre19,800
| 23–49

|- bgcolor="ffcccc"
| 73
| April 1
| Detroit
| 
| Voshon Lenard (21)
| Michael Bradley, Jelani McCoy (14)
| Alvin Williams (6)
| Air Canada Centre18,237
| 23–50
|- bgcolor="bbffbb"
| 74
| April 2
| @ Detroit
| 
| Vince Carter (18)
| Jerome Williams (16)
| Alvin Williams (6)
| The Palace of Auburn Hills22,076
| 24–50
|- bgcolor="ffcccc"
| 75
| April 4
| San Antonio
| 
| Vince Carter (17)
| Michael Bradley (8)
| Rafer Alston, Vince Carter, Morris Peterson (3)
| Air Canada Centre18,376
| 24–51
|- bgcolor="ffcccc"
| 76
| April 6
| New Jersey
| 
| Vince Carter (28)
| Jelani McCoy (9)
| Alvin Williams (8)
| Air Canada Centre19,319
| 24–52
|- bgcolor="ffcccc"
| 77
| April 8
| @ Miami
| 
| Alvin Williams (16)
| Michael Bradley (8)
| Morris Peterson (5)
| American Airlines Arena14,365
| 24–53
|- bgcolor="ffcccc"
| 78
| April 9
| @ Orlando
| 
| Alvin Williams (15)
| Jerome Williams (10)
| Rafer Alston (7)
| TD Waterhouse Centre14,581
| 24–54
|- bgcolor="ffcccc"
| 79
| April 11
| Milwaukee
| 
| Rafer Alston, Jerome Williams (20)
| Jerome Williams (13)
| Rafer Alston (8)
| Air Canada Centre17,762
| 24–55
|- bgcolor="ffcccc"
| 80
| April 12
| @ New Jersey
| 
| Morris Peterson (22)
| Mamadou N'Diaye, Morris Peterson (8)
| Rafer Alston (7)
| Continental Airlines Arena5,306
| 24–56
|- bgcolor="ffcccc"
| 81
| April 15
| Miami
| 
| Morris Peterson (33)
| Jerome Williams (17)
| Rafer Alston (8)
| Air Canada Centre17,666
| 24–57
|- bgcolor="ffcccc"
| 82
| April 16
| @ Cleveland
| 
| Rafer Alston (23)
| Michael Bradley (10)
| Rafer Alston (8)
| Gund Arena20,251
| 24–58

Player statistics

Regular season

* Statistics include only games with the Raptors

Award winners
 Vince Carter, NBA All-Star Game Appearance, Voted to start (Relinquished spot to a retiring Michael Jordan)

References

External links
 
 

Toronto Raptors seasons
Toronto
Tor